is a Japanese politician of the Liberal Democratic Party, a member of the House of Representatives in the Diet (national legislature). A native of Fuchū, Tokyo and graduate of the University of Tokyo, he was elected for the first time in 2005. As of 2021, he is the Deputy Chief Cabinet Secretary.

He is in the 2nd term from December 2012. His election area is Yokohama city, Kanagawa Prefecture, in Japan.
Now he is Deputy Minister, the Ministry of Land, Infrastructure, Transport, and Tourism.

References

External links 
 Official website in Japanese.
 

1965 births
Living people
People from Fuchū, Tokyo
University of Tokyo alumni
Koizumi Children
Members of the House of Representatives (Japan)
Liberal Democratic Party (Japan) politicians